Diving at the 2017 World Aquatics Championships was held between 14 and 22 July 2017 in Budapest, Hungary.

Events
The following events were contested:

1 m springboard
3 m springboard
10 m platform
3 m springboard synchronized
10 m platform synchronized
3 m mixed springboard synchronized
10 m mixed platform synchronized
Team event

Individual events consisted of preliminaries, semifinals and finals. The order of divers in the preliminary round was determined by computerized random selection, during the technical meeting. The 18 divers with the highest scores in the preliminaries proceed to the semifinals.

The semifinal consisted of the top 18 ranked divers from the preliminary competition and the final consisted of the top 12 ranked divers from the semifinal.

Schedule
13 events were held.

All time are local (UTC+2).

Medal summary

Medal table

Men

Women

Mixed

Participating nations
A total of 245 divers from 43 nations have been entered. The number of divers a nation entered is in parentheses beside the name of the country.

References

External links
Official website

 
Diving
Diving at the World Aquatics Championships
World Aquatics Championships
Diving competitions in Hungary